Australia is a 1989 film directed by Jean-Jacques Andrien.

Cast
 Fanny Ardant as Jeanne Gauthier 
 Jeremy Irons as Edouard Pierson 
 Tchéky Karyo as Julien Pierson 
 Agnès Soral as Agnès Deckers 
 Hélène Surgère as Odette Pierson 
 Maxime Laloux as François Gauthier 
 Patrick Bauchau as André Gauthier 
 Danielle Lyttleton as Saturday Pierson 
 Dorothy Alison as Doreen Swanson

Plot
Australia is about Edouard Pierson, a Belgian-born wool dealer who emigrated to Australia after World War II. The movie actual takes place in Belgium as he returns to his homeland to assist his family with their wool business. Edouard was left a single father after his girlfriend died and when he goes to Belgium he leaves behind this young girl, whom his family don't know about. He meets a beautiful woman, Jeanne, another single parent, and an intense relationship develops. Edouard's relationship with his family has its ups and downs and many secrets are revealed before the movie's conclusion ties everything together.

Awards
 1989 Venice Film Festival - Golden Osella for Best Cinematography - Giorgos Arvanitis
 1990 Joseph Plateau Awards - Best Belgian Cinematography - Giorgos Arvanitis

References

External links
 

1989 films
1989 crime drama films
Belgian drama films
French drama films
1980s French-language films
Films directed by Jean-Jacques Andrien
Films with screenplays by Jacques Audiard
Films scored by Nicola Piovani
1980s French films